Jawad Youssef Fares (born 1991 in Madrid, Spain) is a Lebanese medical doctor, researcher and scientist. He was selected for the Forbes 30 Under 30 list in science and healthcare for his contribution to solving healthcare problems in the developing world. He also featured twice in the Forbes Middle East 30 Under 30, and was selected as one of the top 10 young scientists in the world by Genetic Engineering and Biotechnology News. In 2019, Fares was elected as a Fellow of The World Academy of Medical Sciences, and in 2021 was one of the Young Physician Leaders selected by the InterAcademy Partnership .

Early life 
Fares was born in Spain and raised in Beirut, the eldest of four siblings of neurosurgeon Youssef Fares and architect-psychologist Aida Hoteit. He credits his upbringing for his thirst for knowledge and medical discovery. Fares earned a B.S. degree in Biology from the American University of Beirut, where he also attended medical school to acquire his M.D. degree. He, concurrently, attained an M.S. degree in Neuropsychology from the Lebanese University Neuroscience Research Center. In 2018, Fares moved to the United States to pursue postdoctoral research in Neuro-oncology at Northwestern University. He further completed a postgraduate medical program in Cancer Biology and Therapeutics at Harvard Medical School.

Career 
Fares served in several positions, as Senior Researcher at the Lebanese University Neuroscience Research Center, Research Fellow at the American University of Beirut Medical Center, and Visiting Researcher at the Montreal Neurological Institute/McGill University. , he is a postdoctoral fellow in neurological surgery at Northwestern University, where he conducts translational research on advanced brain tumors in the laboratory of Maciej Lesniak.

Research 
Fares's research entails neuroscience, neurosurgery, conflict medicine and global health. In Lebanon, he explored injuries resulting from cluster munitions, which are bombs that release many smaller submunitions, to highlight the effects of these weapons on humanitarian and ecological levels. During the 2006 Lebanon War, it was estimated that 4.6 million submunitions were released over Lebanese soil, and almost one million of which remained unexploded. These unexploded bombs continued to injure and kill civilians after the war ended. Fares studied cases of amputations and injuries involving multiple regions of the body due to blast explosions. These injuries often led to disability, and significant social and mental health problems. His research led to the "Fares Scale of Injuries due to Cluster Munitions" that assesses injuries based on functional impairment. The scale helped better classify the wounds of victims and determine the best possible treatment.

At the Montreal Neurological Institute/McGill University, Fares worked with Rolando Del Maestro on NeuroVR (previously NeuroTouch), a virtual reality neurosurgical simulator that provides a platform for training, planning and evaluating systems for patient-specific neurosurgical oncology and other advanced surgical procedures. Their work led to the validation of multiple neurosurgical scenarios on the NeuroVR.

Honors 
 Forbes 30 Under 30 Europe list in Science & Healthcare, 2018
 Forbes Middle East – Arab 30 Under 30, 2018
 Top 10 Under 40, Genetic Engineering and Biotechnology News, 2018
 “Arab Youth Pioneer,” World Government Summit, Dubai, 2018
 The Distinguished Pioneer Award, Lebanese University, “for his outstanding scientific achievements,” 2018
 Award of Honor, American University of Beirut Faculty of Medicine, “for his outstanding achievement in impactful humanitarian research,” 2018
 The NRC Medal of Honor, Lebanese University Neuroscience Research Center, “for his contribution to science and medicine,” 2018
 Elected Fellow, The World Academy of Medical Sciences, “for his outstanding contributions to the advancement of the medical sciences,” 2019
 Forbes Middle East 30 Under 30, 2019

References

External links 
 
 
 Profile at Forbes

1991 births
Living people
People from Madrid
Lebanese scientists
American University of Beirut alumni
Lebanese University alumni
Northwestern University alumni
Harvard University alumni
Harvard Medical School alumni
Academic staff of McGill University
Cancer researchers
Lebanese diaspora